The Central Committee of the 19th Congress of the Communist Party of the Soviet Union (CPSU) was in session from 1952 until 1956. It elected, at its 1st Plenary Session, the Presidium, the Secretariat and the Party Control Committee.

Plenums
The CC was not a permanent institution. The CC was convened for 11 plenary sessions between the 19th Congress and the 20th Congress. When the CC was not in session, decision-making powers were transferred to inner bodies of the CC itself; the Politburo and Secretariat (none of these bodies were permanent either, but convened to decide on crucial matters).

Composition

Members

Candidates

References

Citations

Bibliography

Central Committee of the Communist Party of the Soviet Union
1952 establishments in the Soviet Union
1956 disestablishments in the Soviet Union